Justin Kerrigan (born 1973) is a British writer and film director from Cardiff, Wales, best known for the 1999 film Human Traffic.

About
Born in Cardiff, Kerrigan attended Cantonian High School and then Newport Film School (formerly part of the University of Wales, Newport, now the University of South Wales)  His film credits include I Know You Know & Human Traffic.

Filmography

Film

References

External links

Alumni of the University of Wales, Newport